Aluminite is a hydrous aluminium sulfate mineral with formula: Al2SO4(OH)4·7H2O. It is an earthy white to gray-white monoclinic mineral which almost never exhibits crystal form. It forms botryoidal to mammillary clay-like masses. It has a very soft Mohs hardness of 1–2 and a specific gravity of 1.66–1.82. 

It forms in clay and lignite deposits as an oxidation product of pyrite and marcasite along with aluminium silicates. It also occurs in volcanic sublimates, in native sulfur deposits and rarely in caves. It occurs in association with basaluminite, gibbsite, epsomite, gypsum, celestine, dolomite and goethite.

It was first described in 1807 from Halle, Saxony-Anhalt, Germany and named for its aluminium content. It is also known as alley stone, halite and websterite (named after Orcadian geologist Thomas Webster).

Aluminite is used by tile and masonry workers to reduce the setting time of mortars.

References

External links

Aluminium minerals
Sulfate minerals
Monoclinic minerals
Minerals in space group 14
Luminescent minerals
Drone Video of the Outcrop at Newhaven